Yelvington is a surname. Notable people with the surname include:

Dick Yelvington (1928–2013), American football player
Gladys Yelvington (1891–1957), American ragtime composer
Malcolm Yelvington (1918–2001), American rockabilly and country musician